Dmitri Aleksandrovich Ryzhov (born 26 August 1989) is a Russian former football player.

Career
He played the 2009 season for FC Alania Vladikavkaz on loan from PFC CSKA Moscow. On 2 February 2010 the 20-year-old striker yielded on loan for one year to FC Ural Sverdlovsk Oblast, the footballer arrived in Moscow in January 2008 from FC Krylya Sovetov-SOK and has played in the first team in this same season, together with Alan Dzagoev.

Honours
 Russian Second Division Zone Ural/Povolzhye top scorer: 2007 (17 goals).
 Russian Cup: 2009

International career
Ryzhov was one of the members of the Russian U-17 squad that won the 2006 UEFA U-17 Championship. He is a part of the Russia U-21 side that is competing in the 2011 European Under-21 Championship qualification.

References

1989 births
Sportspeople from Tolyatti
Living people
Russian footballers
Russia youth international footballers
Russia under-21 international footballers
Association football forwards
PFC CSKA Moscow players
FC Spartak Vladikavkaz players
Russian Premier League players
FC Khimki players
FC Mordovia Saransk players
FC Yenisey Krasnoyarsk players
FC Armavir players
FC Lada-Tolyatti players
FC Ural Yekaterinburg players
FC Ararat Moscow players
FC Ararat Yerevan players
Russian expatriate footballers
Expatriate footballers in Armenia
FC Akron Tolyatti players